Xhavit Demneri Street is a street in Tirana, Albania.  It was formerly known as Mustafa Lleshi Street It was given this name in 2010, to honour Xhavit Demneri, an Albanian football hero.

Name change

In the spring of 2010, Tirana officials began ordering that all streets must have visible name signs. Without warning or consultation with the community, a large section of Mustafa Lleshi Street was changed to Xhavit Demneri Street, forcing residents to re-submit all property documents for updating. Many residents now living on Xhavit Demneri continue to refer to their street as Mustafa Lleshi.

Formal inauguration

On Sunday, March 27, 2011, family of Xhavit Demneri, friends, fellow sportsmen and the Municipality of Tirana paid their respects to the memory of Demneri by placing a plaque below the street sign, followed by a reception, at the corner of Mustafa Lleshi Street and Xhavit Demneri street.

Notable residents

Besim Zekthi - Dancer, Artist of the People
Ferid Berberi - Former Weightlifter

Streets in Tirana